Salt Springs is a Syracuse, New York neighborhood, located in the northeastern corner of the city. It corresponds to Onondaga County Census Tract xx.

Borders

Salt Springs is one of the 26 officially recognized neighborhoods of Syracuse, New York. It is located on the east side of the city. Le Moyne College is located just east of the neighborhood.

Geography
It borders three other Syracuse neighborhoods, with Eastwood to the north, Near Eastside to the west, and Meadowbrook to the south.

Residential
Ashton House is one historic home in the neighborhood, which is listed on the National Register of Historic Places.

Commercial
It contains the Le Moyne Plaza, owned by Le Moyne College.

It also contains the Soule Branch Library.

Industrial

Miscellaneous
The Ashton House and Fuller House are listed on the National Register of Historic Places.

It is a predominantly African-American neighborhood, that is generally working to middle class. (check block groups for more information or here: https://statisticalatlas.com/neighborhood/New-York/Syracuse/Salt-Springs/Overview )

Bethany Baptist Church, the second oldest church in the city that worships out of the African American tradition, is also in the neighborhood.

Sources

External links
 City of Syracuse (Official Site) Neighborhoods

Neighborhoods in Syracuse, New York